Waiouru railway station in Waiouru, New Zealand was an intermediate station on the North Island Main Trunk line. It was opened for goods traffic in March 1907, and for passengers on 1 July 1908. At 814 m above sea level, the station was the highest station on the New Zealand rail system. 

The last passenger train on the NIMT to stop at Waiouru was the Overlander, but from 10 April 2005 it no longer stopped here. The station had been closed for goods traffic on 13 October 1986.

In 1940 a branch was built to the military camp, including a  platform. The branch opened on 15 November 1940.

References

External links 

 1906 photo of cutting being excavated near Waiouru
Photo of Royal Mail coach and train
1940 photo of station and Ruapehu

Railway stations in New Zealand
Buildings and structures in Manawatū-Whanganui
Railway stations opened in 1907
Railway stations closed in 2005
Rail transport in Manawatū-Whanganui